Te Aitanga-a-Hauiti is a Māori iwi (tribe) on the East Coast of New Zealand's North Island. Its rohe (tribal area) covers the area from Tawhiti-a-Paoa Tokomaru Bay to Te Toka-a-Taiau Gisborne on the East Coast of the North Island of New Zealand.

Te Aitanga-a-Hauiti comprises over fifty hapu: from Te Whanau-a-Te Aotawarirangi the northern hapu Tokomaru Bay to Ngati Oneone the southern hapu Gisborne. Many can trace their whakapapa (ancestry) back to Takitimu and Horouta waka (migration canoes) that arrived in Tairawhiti, and back to the famous ancestor Paikea. However, Te Aitanga-a-Hauiti trace their whakapapa from Rongomaituaho, grandson of Uenuku and son of Kahutiaterangi, who captained the Tereanini waka.

History

Early history

About the 16th century, following major political and social upheavals between the three brothers Taua-Ariki, Mahaki-Ewe-Karoro and Hauiti, Hauiti eventually stamped his mana over Uawa (Tolaga Bay) as it is known to many local inhabitants; hence the title of the major tribal group in this area Te Aitanga-a-Hauiti, meaning the descendants of Hauiti.

Local hapu and the Hauiti ariki Whakatataare-o-te-rangi encountered the British explorer Captain James Cook in 1769; including Tupaia the Tahitian who accompanied Cook on his voyage around the Pacific Ocean. According to tribal tradition, Hauiti ariki Te Kani-a-Takirau was offered in 1854 the Kingite Crown, but he declined the offer.

Modern history

One of Te Aitanga a Hauiti's more famous modern marae (meeting places) steeped in Māori history is Te Poho-o-Rawiri of Ngati Oneone situated in Gisborne. The origins of Rongowhakaata, the eponymous ancestor, is traced to the area occupied by Te Aitanga-a-Hauiti. Hauiti married the daughter of Rongowhakaata named Kahukura-iti.

Titirangi Maunga is the tribe's maunga (revered mountain), holds a similar name as Titirangi Maunga (Kaiti Hill) in Gisborne. Uawa-nui-a-Ruamatua, dividing the township Tolaga Bay and Hauiti, is the tribe's awa (sacred river).

Notable people

Notable members of the tribe include:
 Parekura Horomia – politician
 Robyn Kahukiwa – artist
 Harry Ngata – association footballer
 Waimarama Taumaunu – netballer
 John Walsh – artist

See also 
 Te Aitanga-a-Māhaki

References

 
Gisborne District